The 2015–16 NJIT Highlanders men's basketball team represented the New Jersey Institute of Technology during the 2015–16 NCAA Division I men's basketball season. The Highlanders, led by eighth year head coach Jim Engles, played their home games at the Fleisher Center. After two seasons as the only Division I independent, they were first year members of the Atlantic Sun Conference. They finished the season 20–15, 8–6 in A-Sun play to finish in to finish in a three way tie for second place. They lost in the quarterfinals of the A-Sun tournament to Stetson. They were invited to the CollegeInsider.com Tournament where they defeated Army, Boston University, and Texas–Arlington to advance to the semifinals where they lost to Columbia.

On April 1, head coach Jim Engles resigned to become the head coach at Columbia. He finished at NJIT with an eight-year record of 111–139.

Roster

Schedule

|-
!colspan=9 style="background:#; color:white;"| Non-conference regular season

|-
!colspan=9 style="background:#; color:white;"| Atlantic Sun Conference regular season

|-
!colspan=9 style="background:#; color:white;"| Atlantic Sun Tournament

|-
!colspan=9 style="background:#; color:white;"| CIT

References

NJIT Highlanders men's basketball seasons
Njit
Njit